Happ is a surname. Notable people with the surname include:

Dieter Happ (born 1970), Austrian snowboarder
Ethan Happ (born 1996), American basketball player
Ian Happ (born 1994), American baseball player
J. A. Happ (born 1982), American baseball player
Thomas "Tom" Happ, developer of Axiom Verge and its sequel

See also
Club Enrique Happ
SuzoHapp North America